Sir Peter Thomas Wanless,  (born 25 September 1964) is an English executive and former civil servant. Since 2013, he has been the chief executive officer of the National Society for the Prevention of Cruelty to Children (NSPCC). In June 2022, he was appointed President of Somerset County Cricket Club. In July 2014, he was appointed by the British government to head a review into historical sex abuse claims.

Early life
Wanless was born on 25 September 1964. He was educated at Sheldon School, then a comprehensive school in Chippenham, Wiltshire. He then studied International History and Politics at the University of Leeds, graduating with a BA degree in 1986. He has since studied on the Advanced Management Programme at Insead.

Career
After joining the Civil Service, he held a variety of posts at the HM Treasury, including Head of Private Finance Policy, and Principal Private Secretary to three Cabinet Ministers. including Michael Portillo, both when Portillo was Chief Secretary to the Treasury and later as Secretary of State for Employment. Wanless later held senior positions within the Department for Education and Skills and its successor the Department for Children, Schools and Families, including Director of School Performance and Reform and Director of Strategy and Communications. 

Wanless was CEO of the Big Lottery Fund between February 2008 and May 2013. Since June 2013, he has been the chief executive officer of the National Society for the Prevention of Cruelty to Children (NSPCC). He was a non-executive director of The Kemnal Academies Trust (TKAT), which operates academy schools in South East England. He is currently a Trustee of the 5Rights Foundation and a member of the advisory board of the UK Government's National Leadership Centre.

Wanless Inquiry
In July 2014, Home Secretary Theresa May announced that he would be leading a review into historical sex abuse claims. His report, written with Richard Whittam QC, was published in November 2014.  It "found nothing to support a concern that files had been deliberately or systematically removed or destroyed to cover up organised child abuse", but also said that it was "not possible to say whether files were ever removed or destroyed to cover up or hide allegations of organised or systematic child abuse by particular individuals because of the systems then in place".

Personal life
Married with one son, the family live in Seal, Kent. Wanless is a lifelong supporter of Somerset County Cricket Club where he serves on the committee. He describes himself as a "fan of jangly guitars, indie pop, Somerset cricket, Borgen....". In June 2022, Wanless was appointed President of Somerset County Cricket Club.

Honours
Wanless was appointed Companion of the Order of the Bath (CB) in the 2007 New Year Honours for his role as Director of School Performance and Reform in the Department for Education and Skills. He was knighted in the 2021 New Year Honours for services to children, young people and the charitable sector.

References

1964 births
Living people
People educated at Sheldon School
Alumni of the University of Leeds
British civil servants
British business executives
Companions of the Order of the Bath
National Society for the Prevention of Cruelty to Children people
Knights Bachelor
People from Seal, Kent
Somerset County Cricket Club presidents